MOSS is a Japanese video game company created in 1993. After the bankruptcy of Seibu Kaihatsu, the development staff of that company formed MOSS, then bought the development rights to the Raiden franchise in order to keep working on new installments. Throughout the years they have diversified their portfolio outside of vertical shooters.

Games developed

Arcade

Console

See also
Seibu Kaihatsu

References

External links
 

Amusement companies of Japan
Video game companies of Japan
Video game development companies
Video game companies established in 1993
Japanese companies established in 1993